Charles Wyrsch (5 July 1920 – 16 June 2019) was a Swiss artist and painter.

Early life 
Wyrsch was born in Buochs, Nidwalden in July 1920. His mother died seven days after having given birth on puerperal fever. His father, Carl II Wyrsch, married a second time. From this marriage came eight children. Wyrsch grew up with his grandparents, Carl I and Maria in Buochs. From 1935 to 1938, he was trained as a painter at his father's place.

Like his great grand uncle Johann Melchior Wyrsch, he aspired to study in depth art in some of the most prestigious Swiss and French art schools.

Art studies 

From 1939 to 1943 he attended the School of Applied Arts in Lucerne.

In the same year Wyrsch left for academic study at the "Ecole des Beaux-Arts" in Geneva. To top off his studies, he was awarded the Prize of the City of Geneva. This price included the use of a studio for a year, five hundred francs and ten days' journey to Paris with art students from all over Switzerland. Back in Switzerland, he took three months private lessons with Albert Pfister in Erlenbach and learned to know the Fauves and the Expressionists.

After this examination favored by Pfister on colors he followed another program at a school of applied arts, this time in Basel with Ernst Buchner and the sculptor Walter Bodmer, with whom he mainly dealt with matters of form. In 1949 he temporarily moved to Paris.

Personal life 

In 1953, he married Edith Hug and settled to Lachen Schwyz. He got his first big orders and successes.

The municipality of Buochs ordered a fresco for the new school building. In the 1950s Wyrsch painted his first series of paintings of the "barons". The elongated faces with hat reminiscent of Modigliani and Utrillo, their paintings he learned during his time in Paris. The turning point in the creative process of Wyrsch took place towards the end of 1950.

Wyrsch died in June 2019 at the age of 98.

Lucerne 

In 1961, he moved with his family to Lucerne. In the monograph by Markus Brischgi (1990), he says: "... The objectivity had driven me into a corner; I destroyed many works and painted with a palette knife in a true color turmoil new pictures ... ". Up to this point, he was committed to the real matter and traditional painting. The affinity for abstraction is a key moment in his life, acting on his later representational paintings.

During this time he also abstracted images of Christ. The Passion theme was deepened by the dramatic experience of the death of his three-year-old little daughter who died on a Good Friday. Under this impression he painted his most famous work, the "Stations of the Cross", 1966, for the Pius Church in Meggen.

Kriens 
In 1971, he moved with his family to Kriens where he bought an atelier house from a painter. In the 1970s, finds Wyrsch, through the stimulation of Bacon's art which represents a new vision of objectivity, to represent back to the people.

In the previously mentioned monography of 1990, he said: "... Bacon's new view of objectivity awakened in me the desire to return to figurative representation of the people, after I had designed color spaces under the influence of Mark Rothko."

He struggled for forms of expressions in a new and accurate representation of the people in our time. Art was for him the medium coverage. Under the impact of increasing environmental devastation followed from 1980 his work referred to him as "the enemy and the protest pictures" with titles like "concrete", "aggression", "flight" or "drug-related".

Work

Style 
Wyrsch's artistic career was based on the expressive of figurative paintings, which he gave up in favor of abstraction for about ten years, to return to the figurative.

His motives were selected by Wyrsch from the traditional genus species. He dealt with Velásquez and El Greco and was inspired by contemporaries. But his paintings remain independent and can be assigned to any style. He described himself as a man of the present and was open to everything new. But he suffered from the threat to nature and the loneliness of man. There were issues that he liked to present in his works. In nudes and portraits, including many self-portraits he expressed this suffering, to his person sometimes bluntly.

Exhibitions 
Charles Wyrsch, Sarnen, Galerie Hofmatt Sarnen 30.5.2015–28 June 2015
Charles Wyrsch. Crânes, Lucerne, Alpineum-Produzentengalerie 8.11.2014–6.12.2014
Tandem. Junge Künstler/innen begegnen Altmeistern der "Innnerschweizer Innerlichkeit" und ihren Zeitgenossen – 40 Jahre danach. Sursee, Sankturbanhof 24.9.2011–1 January 2012
Tandem. Junge Künstler/innen begegnen Altmeistern der "Innnerschweizer Innerlichkeit" und ihren Zeitgenossen – 40 Jahre danach. Altdorf, Uri, Haus für Kunst 18.9.2011–27 November 2011
Tandem. Junge Künstler/innen begegnen Altmeistern der "Innnerschweizer Innerlichkeit" und ihren Zeitgenossen – 40 Jahre danach. Sachseln, Museum Bruder Klaus 4.9.2011–1.11.2011
Tandem. Junge Künstler/innen begegnen Altmeistern der "Innnerschweizer Innerlichkeit" und ihren Zeitgenossen – 40 Jahre danach. Stans, Nidwaldner Museum 3.9.2011–30 October 2011
Tandem. Junge Künstler/innen begegnen Altmeistern der "Innnerschweizer Innerlichkeit" und ihren Zeitgenossen – 40 Jahre danach. Lucerne, Hochschule Luzern – Design & Kunst 4.0.2011–30 October 2011
Charles Wyrsch. Peinture, Kriens, Museum im Bellpark 22.8.2010–14 October 2010
Charles Wyrsch. Dessins, gravures, peintures, Vevey, Galerie Arts et Lettres 13.2.2009–15 March 2009
Jahresausstellung Zentralschweizer Kunstschaffen 2008, Lucerne, Kunstmuseum Luzern 6.12.2008–15 February 2008
«KÜR"-Kantonale Kunst und Käufe Obwalden, Sachseln, Museum Bruder Klaus 16.3.2008–15 June 2008
Top of central Switzerland, Lucerne, Kunstmuseum Luzern, 15.12.2007–17 February 2008
Im Kabinett: Charles Wyrsch. Selbstportraits, Emmenbrücke, Galerie Gersag Emmen, 20.1.2007–25 February 2007
Stilles Leben. Aus der Sammlung der Gemeinde Emmen und der Kunststiftung Emmen, Emmenbrücke, Galerie Gersag Emmen, 1.9.2006–8.10.2006
Zentralschweizer Kunstschaffen. Jahresausstellung 2005, Lucerne, Neues Kunstmuseum Luzern, 9.12.2005–29 January 2006
Zentralschweizer Kunstschaffen. Jahresausstellung 2004, Lucerne, Kunstmuseum Luzern, 4.12.2004–1 January 2005
Charles Wyrsch. Aufzeichner und Auslöscher, Lucerne, Kunstmuseum Luzern, 19.10.2002–1.12.2002
Kreuze der Gegenwart. Deutung + Vision, Einsiedeln, Panorama, 20.5.2001–14 October 2001
Charles Wyrsch mit Cécile Wick und Teresa Chen, Stans, Nidwaldner Museum 28.5.2000–16 July 2000
Meine hunderste Ausstellung. Ein Überblick von 1981–1999, Zell, Galerie Priska Meier, 5.12.1999–9.1.2000
(Teil II), Lucerne, Kunstmuseum Luzern, 20.1.1999–14 February 1999
(Teil I), Lucerne, Kunstmuseum Luzern, 19.12.1998–10.1.1999
3 x Wyrsch, Lucerne. Raum für aktuelle Kunst, 22.8.1998–13 September 1998
Saxifrage, désespoir du peintre. La tendence expressive dans la peinture suisse contemporaine, Sion, Musée cantonal des beaux-arts, Sion, 20.6.1998–10.1.1999
Saxifrage, désespoir du peintre. La tendence expressive dans la peinture suisse contemporaine, Fribourg, Musée d'art et d'histoire, Fribourg, 28.2.1997–1.6.1997
Charles Wyrsch, Lucerne, Kunstmuseum Luzern, 16.3.1996–28 April 1996
Aus der Innerschweiz, Berne, Galerie V.Müller, 27.10.1995–18 November 1995
Expressiv. Schweizer Kunst des 20. Jahrhunderts aus der Sammlung Anliker, Lucerne, Kunstmuseum Luzern, 11.7.1992–20 September 1992
8 Unterwalder Künstler, Basel, Kaserne, 26.3.1988–17 April 1988
8 Unterwalder Künstler, Sarnen, Altes Zeughaus auf dem Landenberg, 20.2.1988–13 March 1988

10 Innerschweizer, Thun, Alte Mühle, 8.6.1985–7 July 1985
Kunstprojekt altes Zuchthaus Sarnen, Sarnen, Altes Zuchthaus Sarnen, 14.8.1983–1.10.1983
Charles Wyrsch, Olten, Kunstmuseum Olten, 24.4.1983–29 May 1983
Kunstmuseum Luzern. Weihnachtsausstellung der Innerschweizer Künstler. Sonderausstellung Peter Amstutz. Lucerne, Kunstmuseum Luzern, 12.12.1982–16 January 1983
Unterwalder, Glarus, Kunsthaus Glarus, 26.6.1982–8 August 1982
Une oeuvre – un artiste. Un artiste – une oeuvre. Exposition Suisse '81, Delémont, Halles des expositions, 22.10.1981–8.11.1981
Charles Wyrsch, Lucernr, Kunstmuseum Luzern, 7.12.1980–11.1.1981
3. Biennale der Schweizer Kunst. Aktualität Vergangenheit, Winterthur, Kunstmuseum Winterthur, 2.4.1978–28 May 1978
Joseph Beuys, Michael Buthe, Franz Eggenschwiler und die Berner Werkgemeinschaft (Konrad Vetter, Robert Welti) Markus Raetz, Diter Rot, Lucerne, Kunstmuseum Luzern, 19.9.1970–25 October 1970
Inner-Schweizer Künstler, Olten, Stadthaus Olten, 19.4.1968–19 May 1968
Schweizerische Kunstausstellung, Lucerne, Kunstmuseum Luzern, 24.6.1961–30 July 1961
Schweizerische Kunstausstellung Basel 1956, Basel, Baslerhalle der Schweizer Mustermesse, 2.6.1956–15 July 1956
Fünf junge Innerschweizer Künstler. Franco Annoni, Rolf Brem, Rolf Meyer-List, Paul Stöckli, Charles Wyrsch, Winterthur, Kunstmuseum Winterthur, 10.5.1953–21 May 1953

Literature 
Tandem. Junge Künstler/innen begegnen Altmeistern der  "Innnerschweizer Innerlichkeit" und ihren Zeitgenossen – 40 Jahre danach. 2011
Charles Wyrsch. Peinture 2010
‹Für viele beginnt hier ihre Existenz als Künstler› 2008
Kantonale Kunst Käufe Obwalden. 1999–2007 2008
Kirchen und Kapellen in Buochs 2007
Tiefe Falten werden hohe Kunst 2007
Top of central Switzerland 2007
Die Kunstsammlung des Kantons Schwyz. Malerei und Plastik bis 2004 2006
Die Selbstbildnisse des Malers Charles Wyrsch 2004
Im Dienst der Kunstsammlung 2004
Die Heimat immer neu erfinden 2003
Ein Künstler sieht sich selbst 2002
Altersporträts und Aktmalereien von Charles Wyrsch 2002
Sehen, spüren und malen im Raum 2002
Kreuze der Gegenwart. Deutung + Vision 2001
Zentralschweizer Kunst 2001
Dschungelausstellung über fast alles 2001
Kreuze 2001
Erotik oder Sex? – Hauptsache es macht Spass 2001
Der alte Mann und die jungen Frauen 2000
Er will sich ein Bildnis machen 2000
"Malen ist wahnsinnig schwer". Kurt Albissers Film über den Maler Charles Wyrsch 2000
Saxifrage, désespoir du peintre. La tendence expressive dans la peinture suisse contemporaine 1997
Charles Wyrsch 1996
Kunstmuseum Olten. Neuzugänge 1983–1992 1993
Expressiv. Schweizer Kunst des 20. Jahrhunderts aus der Sammlung Anliker 1992
Charles Wyrsch. Werke 1942–1990 1990
8 Unterwalder Künstler 1988
Einsichten. Innerschweizer Maler, Bildhauer und Architekten. Gespräche und Bilder aus 90 Ateliers 1985
10 Innerschweizer 1985
Charles Wyrsch 1983
Verein für Originalgraphik 1948–1982 1982
Kunstmuseum Luzern. Weihnachtsausstellung der Innerschweizer Künstler. Sonderausstellung Peter Amstutz 1982
Unterwalder 1982
Une oeuvre – un artiste. Un artiste – une oeuvre. Exposition Suisse '81 1981
Charles Wyrsch 1980
3. Biennale der Schweizer Kunst. Aktualität Vergangenheit 1978
Der Kreuzweg in Meggen 1976
Innerschweizer Kunst – Stansort 1973. Wanderausstellung unter dem Patronat der GSMBA, Sektion Innerschweiz 1973
Innerschweizer Almanach 1972
Joseph Beuys, Michael Buthe, Franz Eggenschwiler und die Berner Werkgemeinschaft (Konrad Vetter, Robert Welti) Markus Raetz, Diter Rot 1970
Inner-Schweizer Künstler 1968
100 Jahre Gesellschaft Schweizerischer Maler, Bildhauer und Architekten 1865–1965 1965
Schweizerische Kunstausstellung Basel 1956 1956

Awards 
Krienser Kulturpreis 1995
Kunst- und Kulturpreis der Stadt Luzern, 1980
Johann-Melchior-Wyrsch-Preis 1977
Anerkennungspreis der Stadt Luzern, 1965
Eidgenössisches Kunststipendium, 1960
Eidgenössisches Kunststipendium, 1956
Eidgenössisches Kunststipendium, 1953

Books 
Edith by Charles Wyrsch, Edition Periferia, 2002 – 56 pages
Charles Wyrsch: Werke 1942–1990 by Markus Britschgi, Edition P. von Matt, 1990 – 167 pages
Charles Wyrsch Peinture by Hilar Stadler, Jean-Christophe Amman 2010 – 108 pages

References

External links

1920 births
2019 deaths
People from Nidwalden
Swiss painters